Francis Nathaniel Conyngham, 2nd Marquess Conyngham, KP, GCH, PC (11 June 1797 – 17 July 1876), styled Lord Francis Conyngham between 1816 and 1824 and Earl of Mount Charles between 1824 and 1832, was an Anglo-Irish soldier, courtier, politician and absentee landlord.

Background and education
Born in Dublin, Conyngham was the second son of General The 1st Marquess Conyngham and Elizabeth, daughter of Joseph Denison, and the brother of Henry, Earl of Mount Charles, and The 1st Baron Londesborough. He was educated at Eton. He became known as Lord Francis Conyngham in 1816 when his father was created Marquess Conyngham and gained the courtesy title of Earl of Mount Charles in 1824 on the early death of his unmarried elder brother.

Political career
Conyngham was returned to Parliament for Westbury in 1818, a seat he held until 1820, and later represented Donegal (succeeding his deceased elder brother the Earl of Mount Charles) between 1825 and 1831. He served under the Earl of Liverpool as Under-Secretary of State for Foreign Affairs between 1823 and 1826 and under Liverpool, George Canning, Lord Goderich and the Duke of Wellington as a Lord of the Treasury between 1826 and 1830. In 1832 he succeeded his father in the marquessate and entered the House of Lords.

In July 1834 Lord Conyngham joined the Whig government of Lord Melbourne as Postmaster General, a post he retained until the government fell in December of the same year, and briefly held the same post under Melbourne again between April and May 1835. The latter month he was sworn of the Privy Council and appointed Lord Chamberlain of the Household. He remained in this position until 1839, when he was succeeded by his brother-in-law the Earl of Uxbridge.

Lord Conyngham was also Vice-Admiral of Ulster between 1849 and 1876 and Lord-Lieutenant of County Meath between 1869 and 1876. He was made a Knight Grand Cross of the Hanoverian Order in 1830 and a Knight of the Order of St Patrick in 1833.

Military career
On 21 September 1820, Conyngham purchased a cornetcy in the 22nd Light Dragoons, but this appointment did not take place, and he was replaced by his brother Lord Albert Conyngham, after he was appointed, without purchase, to be cornet and sub-lieutenant in the 2nd Regiment of Life Guards on 23 April 1821. He purchased a lieutenancy in the 9th Light Dragoons on 24 October 1821, and on 13 December, he exchanged from the half-pay of the 9th Light Dragoons into the 1st Regiment of Life Guards. He exchanged again, into the 17th Light Dragoons, on 3 April 1823, and purchased an unattached captaincy on 12 June 1823. Mount Charles, as he then was, entered the Ceylon Regiment, and purchased an unattached majority on 2 October 1827. He became a Major-General in 1858, a Lieutenant-General in 1866 and a full General in 1874.

Ireland and the Hunger
Burton-Conyngham was an absentee landlord in control of some territories in Ireland; particularly in County Donegal (covering Glenties, Arranmore and most of the barony of Boylagh) in Ulster. He showed little interest in these estates he claimed there. According to Thomas Campbell Foster in an 1845 report for The Times of London newspaper, entitled "Commissioner to report on the condition of the people of Ireland", he had visited the area once in his life for a few days. Burton-Conyngham instead hired John Benbow, an English MP, as his chief managing agent, who visited once a year and sub-agents collected rent from tenants each half a year. Foster's report described these estates as such "from one end of his large estate here to the other, nothing is to be found but poverty, misery, wretched cultivation, and infinite subdivision of land."

As the poverty was particularly severe on Burton-Conyngham's estates, the Great Hunger of 1845–52 was miserable for his tenants. They had been surviving on a diet of potatoes and water, due to the constantly raising rent levels and those in Arranmore lived on seaweed part of the year. Including all of County Donegal, not just territories controlled by Burton-Conyngham, around 13,000 Irish people died as a consequence of the Hunger from 1845 to 1850 and many more emigrated. Burton-Conyngham sold Arranmore in 1847 to the land speculator Walter Chorley of Belfast for £200, who proved more interested in the estate but also far more ruthless (who decided to evict all the sub-tenants, many of whom fled to Donegal Town, while other Islanders were shipped off to the Great Lakes of North America).

Courtier

In his youth, Lord Conyngham was a Page of Honour to the Prince Regent (later George IV). Between 1820 and 1830 he was a Groom of the Bedchamber and Master of the Robes to George IV. As Lord Chamberlain, it fell to him on the death of William IV to go with the Archbishop of Canterbury to Kensington Palace at 5 a.m. on 20 June 1837 to inform Princess Victoria that she was now Queen of Great Britain and Ireland. He was the first to address her as "Your Majesty".

Family
Lord Conyngham married Lady Jane Paget, daughter of Henry Paget, 1st Marquess of Anglesey, on 23 April 1824. They had six children:

George Henry Conyngham, 3rd Marquess Conyngham (1825–1882)
Lady Jane Conyngham (1826–1900), married Francis Spencer, 2nd Baron Churchill and had issue.
Lady Frances Caroline Martha Conyngham (1827–1898), married Gustavus Lambart and had issue.
Lady Elizabeth Georgiana Conyngham (1829-1904), married George Finch-Hatton, 11th Earl of Winchilsea.
Lady Cecilia Augusta Conyngham (1831-1877), married Sir Theodore Brinckman, 2nd Baronet and had issue.
Lord Francis Nathaniel Conyngham (1832–1880), politician.

Lady Conyngham died at Folkestone, Kent, in January 1876, aged 77. Lord Conyngham only survived her by five months and died in London in July 1876, aged 79, after an operation for lithotomy. He was succeeded in the marquessate by his eldest son, George.

References

External links 
 

1797 births
1876 deaths
People educated at Eton College
Irish unionists
Knights of St Patrick
Lord-Lieutenants of Meath
Members of the Privy Council of the United Kingdom
Mount Charles, Francis Conyngham, Earl of
Conyngham, Francis, Lord
United Kingdom Postmasters General
Conyngham, Francis, Lord
Mount Charles, Francis Conyngham, Earl of
Mount Charles, Francis Conyngham, Earl of
Mount Charles, Francis Conyngham, Earl of
UK MPs who inherited peerages
British Army generals
Francis
9th Queen's Royal Lancers officers
17th Lancers officers
British Life Guards officers
Deputy Lieutenants of Donegal
Marquesses Conyngham